Huntington Avenue American League Baseball Grounds is the full name of the baseball stadium that formerly stood in Boston, Massachusetts, and was the first home field for the Boston Red Sox (known informally as the "Boston Americans" before 1908) from  to . The stadium, built for $35,000 (equivalent to $ million in ), was located on what is now Northeastern University, at the time across the New York, New Haven and Hartford Railroad tracks from the South End Grounds, home of the Boston Braves.  

The stadium was the site of the first World Series game between the modern American and National Leagues in 1903, and also saw the first perfect game in the modern era, thrown by Cy Young on May 5, 1904. It had many quirks not seen in modern baseball stadiums, including patches of sand in the outfield where grass would not grow, and a tool shed in deep center field that was in play.

The Huntington Avenue Grounds was demolished after the Red Sox left at the beginning of the 1912 season to play at Fenway Park. The Cabot Center, an indoor athletic venue belonging to Northeastern University, has stood on the Huntington Grounds' footprint since 1954. A plaque and a statue of Cy Young were erected in 1993 where the pitchers mound used to be, commemorating the history of this ballpark in what is now called World Series Way. Meanwhile, a plaque on the side of the Cabot Center (1956) marks the former location of the left field foul pole.
The Cabot facility itself is barely over a quarter mile away to the southwest from another, still-standing Boston area sports facility of that era, Matthews Arena (built in 1910), the original home of the NHL's Boston Bruins when they started play in 1924.

Gallery

References
Ballpark Digest Article on Huntington Avenue Baseball Grounds
Huntington Avenue Baseball Grounds at Baseball Almanac
Info at Ballparks.com
See Huntington family

Baseball venues in Boston
Defunct baseball venues in Massachusetts
Defunct sports venues in Boston
Defunct college football venues
Boston College Eagles football venues
Boston Red Sox stadiums
Defunct Major League Baseball venues
Demolished sports venues in Massachusetts
Northeastern University
1901 establishments in Massachusetts
Sports venues demolished in 1912
1912 disestablishments in Massachusetts